Kab Tak Chup Rahungi is a 1988 Indian Hindi-language film directed by T. Prakash Rao. It stars Aditya Pancholi and Amala in lead roles. This movie was Aditya Pancholi's first lead role in Bollywood. Prior to this movie, he had played supporting roles in hits such as Maalamaal (1988) and Dayavan (1988).

Cast
Aditya Pancholi as Gopal
Amala as Geeta
Kiran Kumar
Kader Khan
Satyen Kappu
Mukri
Vikas Anand
Saeed Jaffrey
Aruna Irani
Rajendra Nath
Urvashi Dholakia as Laxmi

Music
The film's soundtrack was very popular with the Indian audience. Out of the five songs in the soundtrack, "Mitwa Bhool Na Jana" was a major hit.

References

External links

1988 films
1980s Hindi-language films
Films scored by Bappi Lahiri
Films directed by T. Prakash Rao